Daly's Cross is a small settlement in County Limerick, Ireland, about  east of Limerick city, at the junction of the R445 and R525 roads. The village was bypassed in September 2010 by the M7. Previously, Daly's Cross had been considered a dangerous junction and was heavily trafficked as the R445 formed part of the old N7 Dublin to Limerick primary route.

Transport
Castleconnell railway station, which first opened to traffic on 8 August 1858, is nearby.

See also

List of towns and villages in Ireland

References

Towns and villages in County Limerick